The Kurtz's Mill Covered Bridge is a covered bridge that spans Mill Creek in the Lancaster County Park in Lancaster County, Pennsylvania, United States. The bridge is also known as the County Park Covered Bridge, Baer's Mill Covered Bridge, Isaac Baer's Mill Bridge, Keystone Mill Covered Bridge, Binder Tongue Carrier Covered Bridge, and Mill 2A Covered Bridge. The bridge is accessible to road traffic from within the park.

The bridge has a single span, wooden, double burr arch trusses design with the addition of steel hanger rods. The deck is made from oak planks.  It is painted red, the traditional color of Lancaster County covered bridges, on both the inside and outside. Both approaches to the bridge are painted in red with white trim.

The bridge's WGCB Number is 38-36-03. Unlike most historic covered bridges in the county, it is not listed on the National Register of Historic Places. It is located at  (40.0151, -76.2822).

History 
The bridge was built in 1876 by W. W. Upp over the Conestoga River. In 
June 1972, it was damaged by the floodwaters caused by Hurricane Agnes. It was repaired by David Esh in 1975 and moved to its present location in the Lancaster County Park over Mill Creek, a tributary of the Conestoga River.

Dimensions 
Length:  span and  total length
Width:  clear deck and  total width
Overhead clearance: 
Underclearance:

Gallery

See also
Burr arch truss
List of Lancaster County covered bridges

References 

Covered bridges in Lancaster County, Pennsylvania
Bridges completed in 1876
Road bridges in Pennsylvania
Relocated buildings and structures in Pennsylvania
Wooden bridges in Pennsylvania
Burr Truss bridges in the United States